The College Baseball Foundation was formed in 2004 in Lubbock, Texas as a non-profit organization, with the dual aims of awarding the Brooks Wallace Award, and creating the National College Baseball Hall of Fame. The organization also annually presents several other college baseball awards including: the John Olerud Award, National Collegiate Umpire Award, Pitcher of the Year Award, and Skip Bertman Award.

National College Baseball Hall of Fame

The National College Baseball Hall of Fame was created in 2004 by the College Baseball Foundation, and inducted its first class in 2006. The yet-to-be built facility will be named after President George H. W. Bush who captained the Yale Bulldogs baseball team, and as a left-handed first baseman, played in the first two College World Series. As of January 2013, the Foundation had raised approximately $7 million of the $13 million goal, after receiving a $5 million grant from the Moody Foundation.

Awards

Brooks Wallace Award

Named after former Texas Tech Red Raiders shortstop and assistant coach Brooks Wallace, since 2009, this award is given annually to the best collegiate shortstop. From 2004 to 2008, the award was given to the most outstanding player.

John Olerud Award

Named after former Washington State Cougars pitcher and first baseman John Olerud, since 2010, this award is given annually to the best collegiate two-way player.

Pitcher of the Year Award

Since 2009, this award is given annually to the best collegiate pitcher. From 2004 to 2008, the Roger Clemens Award, was given to the best collegiate pitcher by the Greater Houston Baseball Association.

Stopper of the Year Award

This award is presented to the best collegiate relief pitcher, by the NCBWA.

Skip Bertman Award
Named after former LSU Tigers head coach Skip Bertman, since 2013, this award is given annually to the best collegiate head coach. The inaugural award was given to head coach Mike Dickson at Gloucester County College, a Division III member of the National Junior College Athletic Association (NJCAA).

National Collegiate Umpire Award
This award is presented to a collegiate umpire.
2012—Rich Fetchiet
2013—Dale Williams (Pac-8/Pac-10)
2014—Hank Rountree
2015—John Magnusson (SEC)
2019—Jon Bible

George H.W. Bush Distinguished Alumnus Award
This award is presented to a college-athlete alumnus.

See also
List of college baseball awards

References

External links
National College Baseball Hall of Fame

Baseball in Lubbock, Texas
National College Baseball Hall of Fame
College baseball in the United States
Organizations based in Lubbock, Texas
Sports organizations established in 2003